Bukowica  (German: Bockwitz) is a village in the administrative district of Gmina Niegosławice, within Żagań County, Lubusz Voivodeship, in western Poland.

The village has a population of 140.

References

Bukowica